Gangatikuri is a village in Ketugram II CD block in Katwa subdivision of Purba Bardhaman district in the state of West Bengal, India.

Geography

CD block HQ
The headquarters of Ketugram II CD block are located at Gangatikuri.

Urbanisation
88.44% of the population of Katwa subdivision live in the rural areas. Only 11.56% of the population live in the urban areas. The map alongside presents some of the notable locations in the subdivision. All places marked in the map are linked in the larger full screen map.

Demographics
As per the 2011 Census of India Gangatikuri had a total population of 4,053, of which 2,064 (51%) were males and 1,989 (49%) were females. Population below 6 years was 476. The total number of literates in Gangatikuri was 2,067 (57.79% of the population over 6 years).

Transport
Gangatikuri railway station is situated on the Barharwa-Azimganj-Katwa loop.'''

Gangatikuri is on the Uddharanpur-Bolpur/ Suri Road.

Gangatikuri' nearest railway station pachundi station of  katwa-amudpur loop line

Education
Gangatikuri Atindra Nath Bidyamandir, Gangatikuri

Sonartori College of Education at village Balutia, PO Banwaribad, is located near Gangatikuri railway station.

Gangatikui Girls School, Gangatikuri

Vision English medium School, Kalitala, Gangatikuri

MSVR Mission Academy, Gangatikuri

References

Villages in Purba Bardhaman district